Kabal (Urdu and ) is a town in Swat District, Khyber-Pakhtunkhwa province of  Pakistan located  from Mingora city. The old name of kabal was Chendakhwara. It is the tenth largest city in Khyber Pakhtunkhwa and 82nd largest in Pakistan by population.

According to Khyber Pakhtunkhwa Local Government Act 2013. Tehsil Kabal have following 14 Wards:

 Ningolai
 Kabal
 Bara Bandai
 Kuza Bandai
 Kanju
 Hazara
 Bar Abakhail
 Kuz Abakhail
 Kala Kalay
 Deowlai
 Shah Dehrai
 Dardiyal
 Qalagay
 Totano Bandai

There is an 18-hole golf ground, surrounded by calm, lush greenery and a big playground.

Nearby settlements include the villages of Kotlai and Akhun Kalai.

Security challenges 
Pakistan experienced a resurgence of terrorist attacks on high-security sites after a period of calm. The article chronicled the major attacks that took place between 2013 and 2023, targeting military bases, airports, government buildings, and educational institutions. It outlined the attack methods, casualty numbers, and responsible groups. The article emphasized the effect of terrorism on Pakistan's security and the government's counter-terrorism measures.

According to a report by a local think-tank, Pakistan saw a 51% increase in terrorist attacks in one year after the Afghan-Taliban took over Afghanistan in August 2021. The report states that 433 people were killed and 710 were wounded in 250 terrorist attacks in Pakistan. The UN warned of foreign terror groups taking advantage of the situation in Afghanistan.

Civil unrest 
After years of suffering and losses, the locals began to protest against the law enforcement agencies and local government resulting into violent riots and resistance from the government.  

Following these incidents, Pashtun Tahaffuz Movement, a movement for the rights of Pashtun people in Pakistan, called protests in different areas of Swat, including Kabal Tehsil.  

Manzoor Pashteen, the PTM leader, stated that the movement's demands for peace and justice for Pashtuns in Pakistan were constitutional rights. He accused the government of denying these rights, particularly in the tribal areas, and criticized the use of force against PTM's peaceful protests.  

Government considered their protests as violent and unlawful behavior against the state, and began to desist forcefully. PEMRA suspended the license of a private news channel due to their coverage of an opposition politician's press conference. The move was widely criticized by journalists and opposition parties as an attack on press freedom, and the channel's staff held protests against the suspension.Two government officials were held in allegations of involvement with PTM.

Government efforts to stop terrorism 
Police and paramilitary forces established security posts in the Matta and Kabal tehsils of Swat district to prevent terrorist activities. The posts were placed strategically, and their personnel were responsible for manning them. The government aimed to enhance the security situation in the region through this initiative.

The Khyber Pakhtunkhwa Chief Minister, Mahmood Khan, opened a police command and control centre in Swat to improve the security situation in the district. The centre helped the police and law enforcement agencies better handle security challenges and provide a more coordinated response to threats.

Qalagay Road 
Government of Pakistan Tehreek-e-Insaf took necessary steps in order to maintain situation in those areas, and formulated plans for development projects to encourage local and non-Pakistani visitors for tourism.

The construction of roads, bridges, and hotels in Swat gave a boost to tourism in the region, as per local officials. The new infrastructure made it easier for visitors to explore the scenic valley, which was home to ancient Buddhist ruins and a rich cultural heritage.

Villages
Mahak-

References

Populated places in Swat District
Tehsils of Khyber Pakhtunkhwa